Colombia competed at the 2015 World Aquatics Championships in Kazan, Russia from 24 July to 9 August 2015.

Diving

Colombian divers qualified for the individual spots and the synchronized teams at the World Championships.

Men

Women

Mixed

High diving

Colombia has qualified two high divers at the World Championships.

Swimming

Colombian swimmers have achieved qualifying standards in the following events (up to a maximum of 2 swimmers in each event at the A-standard entry time, and 1 at the B-standard):

Men

Women

Mixed

Synchronized swimming

Colombia has qualified two synchronized swimmers to compete in each of the following events.

References

External links
Federación Colombiana de Natación 

Nations at the 2015 World Aquatics Championships
2015
World Aquatics Championships